We Remember Sam Cooke is the fifth studio album recorded by The Supremes, issued by Motown in April 1965. The album is a tribute album dedicated to soul musician Sam Cooke, who had died the previous December. Notable selections on the album, consisting entirely of Cooke covers, included covers of "A Change Is Gonna Come", "You Send Me" and "(Ain't That) Good News" (led by Florence Ballard).

It was the second most successful in a series of themed albums enjoying a number five peak on the Billboard R&B chart.

Track listing
All songs written by Sam Cooke, except where noted.

Side One
"You Send Me"
"Nothing Can Change This Love"
"Cupid"
"Chain Gang" (Sam Cooke, Charles Cook)
"Bring It on Home to Me"
"Only Sixteen"

Side Two
"Havin' a Party"
"Shake"
"Wonderful World" (Sam Cooke, Herb Alpert, Lou Adler)
"A Change Is Gonna Come"
"(Ain't That) Good News"

Personnel
 Diana Ross – lead vocals, background vocals on "(Ain't That) Good News)"
 Florence Ballard – lead vocal on "(Ain't That Good News)", background vocals
 Mary Wilson – background vocals
 Harvey Fuqua, Hal Davis and Marc Gordon – producers

Charts

References

1965 albums
The Supremes albums
Sam Cooke tribute albums
Albums produced by Hal Davis
Albums produced by Harvey Fuqua
Motown albums